Private Eye is a video game developed by Brooklyn Multimedia and published by Simon & Schuster Interactive for Windows in 1996 and Macintosh in 1997.

Gameplay
Private Eye is an interactive murder mystery starring Philip Marlowe.

Reception
Next Generation reviewed the PC version of the game, rating it two stars out of five, and stated that "Unfortunately, there just isn't much game to hang it on. A click or two every 10 minutes does not balance out the hole it'll leave in your checkbook. Even with its alternate endings and intriguing story, you'd probably be better off renting The Big Sleep (the Bogart version, not Mitchum)."

Reviews
Computer Gaming World (Oct, 1996)
Entertainment Weekly (Jul 19, 1996)
PC Player (Germany) - Feb, 1997
GameSpot - Aug 08, 1996
Just Adventure - 2001

References

External links
Review in PC World

1996 video games
Adventure games
Classic Mac OS games
Detective video games
ScummVM-supported games
Simon & Schuster Interactive games
Video games based on novels
Video games developed in the United States
Windows games